Vivir enamorada (English title: To live love) is a Mexican telenovela aired on Televisa.

Cast 
Carlos Piñar as Mario
Sonia Furió as Alicia
Karina Duprez as Karina
Blanca Sánchez as Miriam
Alma Muriel as Estela
Leticia Perdigón as María
Carlos Rotzinger as Gilberto
Anna Silveti as Fedora
Juan Antonio Edwards as Horacio
Demián Bichir as Nacho
Mariana Levy as Verónica
Arlette Pacheco as Raquel
Queta Lavat as Adriana's mother
Manolita Saval as Merceditas
Otto Sirgo as Andres
Luis Torner as Balbiani
Pablo Ferrel as Leonardo
Elvira Monsell as Florencia
Yolanda Lievana as Sandra
José Luis Padilla as Don Julio
Roberto Ruy as Angel
Luis Uribe as Juan Carlos
Antonio Rangel as Victor

Awards

References

External links 

1982 telenovelas
Mexican telenovelas
1982 Mexican television series debuts
1983 Mexican television series endings
Spanish-language telenovelas
Television shows set in Mexico City
Televisa telenovelas